Bembezi is a small town in Matabeleland North, Zimbabwe and is located about 43 km north-east of Bulawayo.

History
The Battle of Bembezi took place nearby on 1 November 1893.

References

Populated places in Matabeleland North Province